Thirumuppath Raghavan Ravi (born 2 March 1965) is the judge of Kerala High Court. The High Court of Kerala is the highest court in the Indian state of Kerala and in the Union Territory of Lakshadweep. The High Court of Kerala is headquartered at Ernakulam, Kochi.

Education
Ravi completed his schooling from schools in Thiruchirappally and Coimbatore, graduation from PSG College of Arts and Science and obtained a law degree from Government Law College, Kozhikode.

Career
Ravi enrolled as an Advocate on 8 January 1989 and started practice at Tirur, Malappuram later shifted his practice to Kerala High Court within few months after his enrollment. He served as honorary reporter of Indian Law Reports (Kerala Series) from 1993 to 1999, as Senior Government pleader from 2004 to 2006, as Special Government pleader (Forests) for a period of three months and was a member of the Statutory Rules Committee of the Kerala High Court till his elevation as Judge. 6 March 2020 he was appointed as additional judge of Kerala High Court.

References

External links
 High Court of Kerala

Living people
Judges of the Kerala High Court
21st-century Indian judges
1965 births
Indian judges